Craig Thomson may refer to:

Craig Thomson (politician) (born 1964), Australian politician
Craig Thomson (footballer, born 1991), Scottish footballer
Craig Thomson (footballer, born 1995), Scottish footballer
Craig Thomson (referee) (born 1972), Scottish football referee

See also 
Craig Thompson (disambiguation)